Cathcart railway station is a railway station serving the Cathcart area of Glasgow, Scotland. Services are provided by ScotRail on behalf of Strathclyde Partnership for Transport.

History 

The station here was opened on 19 March 1894, shortly before the commissioning of the western side of the Cathcart Circle Lines on 2 April that year. It replaced an earlier temporary station opened in 1886, which served as the terminus of the line from Glasgow via Queens Park. The station could then be served by local trains between Neilston &  and Glasgow Central as well as those in both directions around the Circle.

Train services were progressively dieselised from 1958, prior to being electrified in May 1962 (using the 25 kV A.C system). As part of the electrification scheme, the track layout to the south was altered so that through running from the western side of the Circle towards Newton was possible, though these trains still could not call at Cathcart station itself. Services were henceforth operated by  Electric Multiple Units, with the similar  sets also appearing. These were eventually withdrawn from service in 2002 and replaced by  units.

Facilities
The station is staffed on a part-time basis (the ticket office is open Mondays to Saturdays, 06:35 to 13:40 only), with a ticket machine available for purchases outside these times.  There is a waiting room in the main building, along with P.A system and digital information screens for train information provision.  No step-free access is provided, as the platform is reached by a staircase from the street below.

Services

1979
Monday to Saturday two trains per hour were provided in each direction between Glasgow Central and Neilston, and in each direction on the Cathcart Circle. There was no Sunday service.

2006 onwards
Seven days a week two trains per hour are provided in each direction between Glasgow Central and Neilston. Additionally, on Mondays to Saturdays, one train per hour is provided in each direction on the Cathcart Circle.

Routes

References

Notes

Sources 

 
 
 
 

Railway stations in Glasgow
Former Caledonian Railway stations
Railway stations in Great Britain opened in 1886
Railway stations in Great Britain closed in 1894
Railway stations in Great Britain opened in 1894
SPT railway stations
Railway stations served by ScotRail